Dexter is an unincorporated community in Effingham County, in the U.S. state of Illinois.

History
The Dexter post office closed in 1926. The community's name honors Josia Lufkin Dexter, a local pioneer.

References

Unincorporated communities in Effingham County, Illinois
Unincorporated communities in Illinois